Whisperin' Bluegrass is a studio album by American country singer-songwriter Bill Anderson. It was released on October 23, 2007 via Madacy Entertainment and was produced by Steve Ivey. The project was Anderson's 41st studio recording in his career and his first album containing bluegrass music. A total of 16 tracks were included on the project, many of which were covers of songs previously recorded by others. It received positive reviews upon its release.

Background and content
Whisperin' Bluegrass began as a project to bring back a more traditional style of country music. According to Anderson, bluegrass reminded him of the more traditional country he grew up listening to. "A lot of these young kids are learning to play guitars and mandolins. They’re bringing a whole new interest to the genre. Mainstream country music has drifted pretty far from the shore, and bluegrass music is somewhat of an alternative," Anderson commented. Whisperin' Bluegrass was recorded at the IMI Studio, located in Nashville, Tennessee. It was produced by Steve Ivey, making the album Anderson's first to be produced by Ivey.

The album was a collection of 16 tracks. Half of the songs recorded for project were cover versions of hymns first recorded in a gospel style. Eight of the other tracks were written by Anderson. Several of the album's tracks were duets Anderson recorded with other country artists. Duets are included with Vince Gill, Willie Nelson, Dolly Parton and Jon Randall. Jan Howard was another featured duet partner on the project. Howard was Anderson's longtime collaborator during his years recording for Decca Records.

Release and reception

Whisperin' Bluegrass was released on October 23, 2007 on the Madacy Entertainment label. It was issued as a compact disc and a music download. The album did not chart on any publication at the time of its release, including Billboard.

The album received positive reviews upon its original release. C. Eric Banister of Country Standard Time gave the effort a favorable response in 2007, highlighting the album's three new tracks and his vocal duets. Chet Flippo of Country Music Television called Whisperin' Bluegrass "a terrific album of country and gospel songs done up with bluegrass instrumentation." Don Rhodes of The Augusta Chronicle also gave the album critical acclaim. Rhodes noted that the project's instrumentation was "perfection" and the voices on the record were "so pure" and "so real". "The songs are some of the best in country, bluegrass and gospel music," Rhodes concluded.

Track listing

Personnel
All credits are adapted from the liner notes of Whisperin' Bluegrass and Allmusic.

Musical personnel
 Bill Anderson – lead vocals
 Charlie Chadwick – upright bass
 Vince Gill – guest artist
 Jan Howard – guest artist
 Rob Ickes – dobro
 Steve Ivey – background vocals, acoustic guitar, keyboards, piano
 Andy Leftwich – fiddle, mandolin
 Willie Nelson – guest artist
 Dolly Parton – guest artist
 Jon Randall – guest artist
 Keith Sewell – background vocals
 Lester Earl Singer – acoustic guitar
 Mike Toppins – acoustic guitar, banjo, dobro

Technical personnel
 Steve Ivey – engineering, mixing, producer
 Mike Toppins – production assistant

Release history

References

2007 albums
Bill Anderson (singer) albums
Madacy Entertainment albums